The 2011 PartyPoker.com World Grand Prix was the fourteenth staging of the World Grand Prix. It was played from 3–9 October 2011 at the Citywest Hotel in Dublin, Ireland.

James Wade was the defending champion, however, he lost in the semi-finals to Brendan Dolan who had the unique achievement of becoming the first player to achieve a televised nine-dart finish during a leg in which the players had to start on a double. However, he lost the final to Phil Taylor, who won the World Grand Prix for the tenth time.

Prize money
The total prize fund was £350,000. This was the same for the third World Grand Prix tournament. The following was the breakdown of the fund:

Qualification
The field of 32 players were mostly made up from the top 16 in the PDC Order of Merit on September 19, two weeks after the two Players Championships in Derby. The top 8 from these rankings were also the seeded players. The remaining 16 places went to the top 14 non-qualified players from the Players Championship Order of Merit (which was increased by two,) and then to the top 2 non-qualified residents of the Republic of Ireland and Northern Ireland from the 2011 Players Championship Order of Merit who competed in at least six Players Championship events (reduced by two).

Draw

Television coverage and sponsorship
The tournament was screened by Sky Sports in high definition.

PartyPoker.com sponsored the event for the first time, taking over from Bodog after just one year.

References

External links
2011 World grand Prix Netzone

World Grand Prix (darts)
World Grand Prix
World Grand Prix (darts)